Elixia is a Nordic chain of fitness centers that offers everything from strength training, cardio and weight training to different types of classes, such as aerobics, dance, fitness, martial arts, yoga and cycling hours.

ELIXIA Holding AS is the parent company ELIXIA's operations, and the majority shareholder is Altor Fund III. In 2010, the turnover of the group was about NOK 930 million. Elixia Norway has 37 centers, Finland 14 and Sweden three centers. In total Elixia has about 185 000 members.

ELIXIA's vision is "Keep Members for Life".

References

Health clubs
Medical and health organisations based in Norway